Iranian Labour News Agency (ILNA) is an Iranian news agency.

History and profile
ILNA was launched in Tehran on 24 February 2003, and provides coverage of the country's trade unions.

In 2007 ILNA was closed down and relaunched in July 2008.

ILNA provided TV coverage of the 89th Academy Awards, where The Salesman won for Best Foreign Language Film.

References

External links
Iranian Labour News Agency

2003 establishments in Iran
News agencies based in Iran
Mass media in Tehran
Politics of Iran
Labour in Iran